Helen Cross may refer to:

 Helen Cross (author) (born 1967), English author
 Helen Cross (politician), Australian politician
 Helen Cross (physician), British paediatric doctor and research professor